Poole Town is an electoral ward in Poole, Dorset. Since 2019, the ward has elected 2 councillors to Bournemouth, Christchurch and Poole Council.

History 
The ward formerly elected three councillors to Poole Borough Council.

Geography 
The ward covers Poole Town Centre, Longfleet and Baiter Park.

Councillors 
Three from the Poole People Party.

Election results

2019

References 

Wards of Bournemouth, Christchurch and Poole
Politics of Poole